This is a list of the largest trading partners of United Kingdom based on data from Office for National Statistics Pink Book for 2017 Goods and Services.

{| 
|-
| style="vertical-align:top;" |

References

Foreign trade of the United Kingdom
Economy-related lists of superlatives
Lists of trading partners
Trading partners